Jadhavwadi is a village of approximately 2,500 people in the Khanapur taluka of the Sangli district of Maharashtra, India.

Nearby locations
Khanpur- Bhud (lengare) Road
 Gorewadi, 
 Jakhinwadi, 
 Ainwadi
 Dhorale
 Khanapur (Taluka)
Vita
Bhood
Lengare
Devikhindi

Villages in Sangli district